Varghese, Varughese, Verghese, Geevarghese, Varughis, and Varkey are Syriac–Malayalam variants of the Assyrian Syriac/Aramaic Christian name Giwargis/Gewargis/Givargis (George) in India. The pronunciation from Syriac/Aramaic was naturally adapted to fit the vowels of the local dialect.  It is given as first name or last name among the  Syrian Christians (an ancient community of Christians in India) and  Latin Catholics of Malabar. Many names of this community are a combination of Hebrew and Aramaic names that have been adapted into the local dialect.

People named Varghese

Varghese as given name
Verghese Kurien (1921–2012), recipient of Padma Vibhushan and known as "Father of the White Revolution"
Varghese Mathai, professor of mathematics at University of Adelaide
Geevarghese Mar Gregorios, canonized Christian saint by the Malankara Orthodox Syrian Church
Varghese Daniel (born 1956), cricketer
Varghese Johnson (born 1982), boxer
Varghese Payyappilly Palakkappilly (1876–1929), venerable canonized by the Syro-Malabar Church
Arikkad Varghese (1938–1970), murdered activist
 Varghese Thekkevallyara, author of "The Postcolonial Other: Insights into the Colonial Underpinnings of Mandatory Clerical Celibacy among the St. Thomas Christians of India" and other articles.

Varghese as last name
Abraham Verghese (born 1955), professor of medicine at Stanford University Medical School and recipient of National Humanities Medal
B. G. Verghese  (1927-2014), Indian information adviser to Prime Minister Indira Gandhi
Sunny Varkey, education entrepreneur and education philanthropist
Dhanya Mary Varghese, Indian actress
Sugith Varughese, Indian-Canadian actor
George Varghese, a principal researcher at Microsoft Research
Abi Varghese, Indian-American writer-director-produce
Serena Varghese, American voice actress 
N. F. Varghese, Malayalam film actor
Antony Varghese, Malayalam film actor
Balu Varghese, Malayalam film actor
Honey Rose, Malayalam film actress
Mary Verghese, Recipient of Padma Shri
T.M. Varghese, Indian Freedom-fighter and Lawyer
Paul Varghese, stand-up comedian
Peter Varghese, Australian diplomat and secretary of the Department of Foreign Affairs and Trade
Sijoy Varghese, Indian ad film director/producer, event director, screenwriter and actor
Varkey Vithayathil, former cardinal-priest of S. Bernardo alle Terme
Dr Lin varghese, BHMS, MBBS, MDRD, famous radiologist. 
Fr. Baby Varghese, author and professor of Syriac studies, liturgy, and sacramental theology at Orthodox Theological Seminary, Kottayam

Varughese as last name
Notable people with the surname Varughese:

Sugith Varughese (born 1958), Indian-born Canadian writer, director, and actor
Sunil Varughese(born 1968),Indian -born branding consultant, was Chief Brand & Sustainability Officer of XLRI.

See also
People from Kerala
Varughese

References

Indian given names
Indian masculine given names
Surnames of Indian origin